Lochar Thistle Football Club are a football club originating in 1969 from the villages of Locharbriggs and Heathhall in the town of Dumfries in Scotland.

They originally competed in the Dumfries & District Amateur Football League where they were First Division Champions on three occasions. The club also went on a record 42 game unbeaten League run between 2010 and 2012. They joined the South of Scotland Football League for the 2013–14 season. They play their home games at Maxwelltown High School which accommodates approximately 1,000 spectators. The club was accredited in December 2015 with the Standard Level Quality Mark from the SFA.

The club have won The Potts Cup in 2015–16 season and were also the first winners of the Alba Cup in the 2016–17 season.

In 2009, 80 year old club stalwart, George Kirk was awarded Volunteer of the Year in Amateur football.

External links 
 Official website

Football clubs in Dumfries and Galloway
South of Scotland Football League teams